Byron Forceythe Willson (April 10, 1837 – February 2, 1867) was a nineteenth-century American poet. He was the brother of Kentucky governor Augustus E. Willson.

Personal life
Byron Forceythe Willson was born April 10, 1837 in Little Genesee, Allegany County, New York. He was the eldest son of Hiram and Ann Colvin (Ennis) Willson. Though his parents addressed him as "Byron", he developed a dislike for the name, and eventually dropped it during his early manhood. In 1846, his father loaded the family and their belongings on a raft and floated down the Allegany and Ohio Rivers to Maysville, Kentucky. A year later, the family moved again, this time to Covington, Kentucky, where they lived for six years, before removing to New Albany, Indiana. This would be the last move of Hiram Willson's life. He died in 1859, and was preceded in death by his wife in 1853.

Willson's father had been a Unitarian, and his mother was a Seventh Day Baptist, but Forceythe developed his own unique beliefs about spirituality. He believed that the living could communicate with the dead, and that he was a medium through which this could be accomplished. He claimed to have had a conversation with his late father some years after his death. He also maintained that he was clairvoyant, and was able to divine the contents of unopened letters, as well as some information about their authors, by placing the envelope to his forehead.

In 1863, Willson married Elisabeth Conwell Smith, a poet from New Albany, Indiana. She died the following year, after the loss of their baby.  Both Elisabeth, and the child are buried in Laurel, Indiana. From that time until his own death, many who were with him observed him having conversations with the spirit of his dead wife. Shortly following her death, he told a friend "It has left me neither afflicted nor bereaved... And strangest of yet all, the blessed Presence is at times so plain that I can scarcely believe the tender tie of her embodiment is broken."

Career
Willson attended Antioch College in Ohio and Harvard University but was prevented from finishing a credential by the onset of tuberculosis. Instead, he became an editorial writer for the Louisville Journal (later part of the Louisville Courier-Journal.) His missives often defended the Union cause in the Civil War. He also published some of his early poetry in the Journal, including his most famous work, "The Old Sergeant", which told a real account of actual people.

In 1864, Willson moved to Cambridge, Massachusetts to oversee the education of his brother Augustus. On a return trip to New Albany, he was stricken with a pulmonary hemorrhage. Though he eventually recovered enough to make the return trip, he died February 2, 1867.

Selected works of Forceythe Willson
 "The Old Sergeant", 1863
 "In State"

References

1837 births
1867 deaths
Harvard University alumni
Poets from New York (state)
Poets from Indiana
People from Allegany County, New York
Deaths from pulmonary hemorrhage
People from New Albany, Indiana
American male poets
19th-century American poets